John Alfred Healing (14 June 1873 in Tewkesbury, Gloucestershire, England – 4 July 1933 in Caister-on-Sea, Norfolk) was an English cricketer. A left-handed batsman, he played first-class cricket for Gloucestershire County Cricket Club between 1899 and 1906.

Career

Healing was educated at Clifton College and Pembroke College, Cambridge. He made his first-class debut for Cambridge University in May 1894, playing against AJ Webbe's XI and Yorkshire. He played a match for Gloucestershire against Dublin University the following month, and played for the Straits Settlements against Hong Kong and Shanghai in November 1897.

He returned to play in England, playing sporadically for Gloucestershire between 1899 and 1906. In 1899, he played two County Championship matches against Nottinghamshire and Warwickshire, followed by five more county championship matches in 1901, his busiest season. He played against South Africa in 1904, and played his final two first-class matches, against Cambridge University and Somerset in June 1906.

References

1873 births
1933 deaths
People educated at Clifton College
Alumni of Pembroke College, Cambridge
English cricketers
Straits Settlements cricketers
Gloucestershire cricketers
Cambridge University cricketers
People from Caister-on-Sea
People from Tewkesbury
Sportspeople from Gloucestershire